Osman Özdemir (born 1 September 1961) is a Turkish football manager and former player

Coaching career
In 2009 Özdemir obtained a UEFA Pro License.

References

1961 births
Living people
Turkish footballers
Gençlerbirliği S.K. footballers
Adanaspor footballers
Sakaryaspor footballers
Yimpaş Yozgatspor footballers
Konyaspor footballers
Turkish football managers
Orduspor managers
Adanaspor managers
Konyaspor managers
Adana Demirspor managers
Kartalspor managers
Sakaryaspor managers
Diyarbakırspor managers
Association footballers not categorized by position